Colias euxanthe, the Puna clouded sulphur, is a butterfly in the family Pieridae. It is found in  the Tropical Andes subregion of the Neotropical realm (Peru, Bolivia and  Ecuador).

Subspecies
C. e. euxanthe – [Peru]
C. e. alticola Godman & Salvin, 1891 – [Ecuador]
C. e. hermina (Butler, 1871) – [Peru, Bolivia]
C. e. stuebeli Reissinger, 1972 – [Peru]

References

External links
Butterflies of America type images
NSG and NSG Voucher Images

Butterflies described in 1865
euxanthe
Pieridae of South America
Taxa named by Baron Cajetan von Felder
Taxa named by Rudolf Felder